Cable bacteria are filamentous bacteria that conduct electricity across distances over 1 cm in sediment and groundwater aquifers. Cable bacteria allow for long-distance electron transport, which connects electron donors to electron acceptors, connecting previously separated oxidation and reduction reactions. Cable bacteria couple the reduction of oxygen or nitrate at the sediment's surface to the oxidation of sulfide in the deeper, anoxic, sediment layers.

Discovery
Long-distance electrical conductance in sediment was first observed in 2010 as a spatial separation of sulfide oxidation and oxygen reduction in marine sediment that was interrupted and re-established at a rate faster than could be explained by chemical diffusion. It was later found that this electrical conductance could be observed across a non-conductive layer of glass microspheres, where the only possible conductive structures were filamentous bacteria belonging to the family Desulfobulbaceae. The conductivity of single, live filaments was later demonstrated by observing the oxidation state of cytochromes using Raman microscopy. The same phenomenon was later observed in freshwater sediments and groundwater aquifers. Within a 15 cm thick top layer of sediment, cable bacteria densities providing total length of up to 2 km per square centimeter of surface have been observed.

Morphology
Cable bacteria filaments are 0.4—1.7 µm in diameter and up to 15 mm long. Filaments consist of rod-shaped cells with an average length of 3 µm. Filaments are long strings composed of cells stacked together, and can be as long as 30-70mm. Some filaments are composed of upwards of 10,000 cells. Each cell has between 15 and 54 ridges, and ridges span the entire length of the filament. These ridges are hypothesized to contain the cells' conductive structures.

Junctions 
Cells in a filament are connected by junctions. The diameter of junctions between cells in the filament varies from being smaller than the cell diameter, the same diameter as the cells on either side of the junction, or bulging out to become wider than the cell diameter. Junctions are able to withstand more force without breaking than the cells themselves. Cells on opposite sides of each junction are separated; if one cell bursts, the cell on the other side of the junction will remain intact.

Strings 
Cable bacteria contain structures known as strings. Strings are located inside of ridges on the outer membrane and connect one cell to the next. Strings span the length of the entire filament uninterrupted. The width of the strings is about 20-40 nm. The size and function of a string is similar to that of a microtubule. Strings are thought to serve as a structural foundation for filaments and play a key role in maintaining filament shape, especially during growth.

Distribution 
Cable bacteria are generally found in reduced sediments. They can be present as a single filament or as an agglomeration of filaments. Cable bacteria have been identified as being intertwined with the root hairs of aquatic plants and are present in the rhizosphere. Their distribution ranges a gradient of salinities; they are present in freshwater, saltwater lakes, and marine habitats. Cable bacteria have been identified in a diverse range of climatic conditions worldwide, including Denmark, the Netherlands, Japan, Australia, and the United States.

Motility
Cable bacteria lack flagella, but are capable of motility in the form of gliding by propelling themselves forward through the excretion of substances. Cable bacteria have been observed to move as fast as 2.2 µm/s, with an average speed of 0.5 µm/s. Speed of motility in cable bacteria is not related to size of the bacteria. The average distance a cable bacterium glides is approximately 74 µm without interruption. Cable bacteria filaments tend to bend in half, and their movement is led by the apex of the bend as opposed to leading with one tip of the filament. Twisting to move through rotational gliding is rare, but does occur. Cable bacteria likely engage in oxygen chemotaxis, as they are observed to move when in anoxic or hypoxic environments, and cease gliding when contact with oxygen is made. Although motility is important for other microorganisms, once cable bacteria are located in a place that connects oxygen to sulfide, they no longer need to move. The reduced need for motility could explain why the cable bacteria genome contains fewer operons related to chemotaxis than other Desulfobulbaceae. Fewer operons related to chemotaxis results in limited motility.

Taxonomy
The two candidate genera of cable bacteria until now (2016) described: Electrothrix containing four candidate species, found in marine or brackish sediments, and Electronema  containing two candidate species, found in freshwater sediments, seem to be a monophyletic group. Freshwater and marine cable bacteria have been found to be 88% similar based on 16S ribosomal RNA comparisons. These genera are classified within the family Desulfobulbaceae. Cable bacteria are defined by their function rather than their phylogeny, and it is possible that further cable bacteria taxa will be discovered.

Ecological significance
Cable bacteria strongly influence the geochemical properties of the surrounding environment. Their activity promotes the oxidation of iron at the surface of the sediment, and the resulting iron oxides bind phosphorus-containing compounds and hydrogen sulfide, limiting the amount of phosphorus and hydrogen sulfide in the water. Phosphorus can cause eutrophication, and hydrogen sulfide can be toxic to marine life, meaning that cable bacteria play an important role in maintaining marine ecosystems in coastal areas.

Methane emissions 
The presence of cable bacteria can lead to a decrease in methane emissions from saturated soils. The transfer of electrons through cable bacteria allows the sulfate reduction that occurs in inundated soils to be balanced by sulfate oxidation. Oxidation is possible because of the release of electrons through the cable bacteria filaments. Through this balance, sulfate remains readily available for sulfate reducing bacteria, which out compete methanogens. This causes a decrease in production of methane by methanogens.

Practical applications
Cable bacteria have been found associated with benthic microbial fuel cells, devices that convert chemical energy on the ocean floor to electrical energy. In the future, cable bacteria may play a role in increasing the efficiency of microbial fuel cells deployed in sedimentary environments. Cable bacteria have also been found associated with a bioelectrochemical system that enhances the degradation of marine sediment contaminated by hydrocarbons  and thus may play a role in future oil spill cleanup technologies.

See also 
 Biodegradable electronics

References

External links 

Microorganisms
Bacteria
Environmental microbiology